The 1926 Dayton Marcos season was the second and final season for the franchise in the Negro National League.

Offseason

Reorganization and reentry into Negro National League 
Following the 1920 season, the Dayton Marcos franchise was replaced in the Negro National League by the Columbus Buckeyes, who lasted a single season. The Marcos played independent ball until 1926, when they were once again granted a spot in the upcoming NNL season. Among owner John Matthews' first moves was to combine forces with local funeral director H.P. Lorritts and absorb the local C.M.I.A.'s (Colored Men's Improvement Association) semi-pro team. In addition to having first pick of players from the C.M.I.A.'s roster, the Marcos took over the lease to Westwood Field, their home in 1920.

Other home fields 
In addition to their primary home in Dayton, the Marcos split their time between several other locations in an effort to widen the team's fan base.

Richmond, Indiana 
On the eve of opening day, the Marcos announced they would play some home games at Exhibition Park in Richmond, Indiana. Richmond was no stranger to the Marcos, having hosted several exhibition games featuring the club as early as 1909.

Xenia, Ohio 
The Marcos claimed territory approximately 20 miles East of Dayton and made Washington Park in Xenia, Ohio their home for Wednesday games.

See also 
1920 Dayton Marcos season

References

Negro league baseball seasons
Dayton, Ohio